Pœuilly is a commune in the Somme department and Hauts-de-France region of northern France.

Geography
Pœuilly is situated on the D1029 road, some 14 km west-north-west of Saint-Quentin.

Population

See also
Communes of the Somme department

References

Communes of Somme (department)